This list of governors of Maniema includes governors of the Maniema Province, Democratic Republic of the Congo from when it was first formed on 14 August  1962 until 25 April 1966, when it was merged with Kivu Central to form Sud-Kivu.
It also covers governors from when Maniema was again formed from part of Kivu Province on 20 July 1988 to the present.

First period (1962–1966)

The governors in the period from 14 August 1962 until 25 April 1966 were:

Second period (1988 – present)

The governors from 20 July 1988 to the present were:

See also

List of governors of Kivu
Lists of provincial governors of the Democratic Republic of the Congo

References

Maniema
Governors of provinces of the Democratic Republic of the Congo